Reese Paul Andy (born March 31, 1973) is a retired American mixed martial artist. A professional from 2005 until 2008, he fought in the UFC and was a member of the Seattle Tiger Sharks in the IFL.

Background
Andy grew up in a family of four brothers, all of whom were All-American wrestlers. He started organized wrestling in the sixth grade, and went on to become a three-time 4-A state champion at Skyview High School in Billings, Montana. He also earned a Bronze Medal in the 1991 Greco-Roman Junior World Championships and participated in the 1993 World Espoir Greco-Roman Championships.

Wrestling career
Andy wrestled in the 177-pound division for the Wyoming Cowboys from 1994-96. He earned All-America honors in each of his three seasons, finishing sixth nationally at his weight in 1995 and second in 1994 and '96. He finished his collegiate career ranked seventh in school history with 110 career wins and seventh with 38 wins in a single season (1996). He was inducted into the Wyoming Athletics Hall of Fame in 2004.

NCAA Division 1
 1994 – 177 lbs, 2nd
 1995 – 177 lbs, 6th
 1996 – 177 lbs, 2nd

ADCC grappling
Andy was a competitor at both the 2003 and 2005 ADCC Submission Wrestling World Championship.  In 2003, he won one and lost one match in both the -88 kg division and absolute divisions.  In 2005, he won one and lost one match in the -88 kg division and lost his only bout in the absolute division.

Mixed martial arts career

Early career
Andy began training in mixed martial arts in 2000 after seeing the success college wrestlers were having in the sport. He turned pro in 2005, winning two fights with the Superbrawl promotion in Hawaii before being signed by the upstart International Fight League.

International Fight League
Andy recorded a 5–1 record in six bouts with the IFL, posting his first career loss against fellow collegiate wrestler Aaron Stark. He fought in the main event of IFL: Everett on June 1, 2007 vs. Krzysztof Soszynski. Despite coming in just over the heavyweight minimum at 208 pounds, he defeated the much larger and more experienced Soszynski via split decision.

Ultimate Fighting Championship
After his victory over Soszynski, Andy signed a contract with the UFC. He made his UFC debut losing to Brandon Vera via unanimous decision at UFC: Silva vs. Irvin in Las Vegas, Nevada on July 19, 2008.

Andy lost to Matt Hamill via TKO in the second round at UFC 92 on December 27, 2008. 

Following his loss to Hamill, Andy was cut from the UFC.

Personal life
Currently, Andy runs his own gym and teaches MMA classes at West Coast Fight Team in Auburn, Washington.

Mixed martial arts record

|-
|Loss
|align=center|7–3
|Matt Hamill
| TKO (punches)
|UFC 92
|
|align=center|2
|align=center|2:19
|Las Vegas, Nevada, United States
|
|-
|Loss
|align=center|7–2
|Brandon Vera
| Decision (unanimous)
|UFC Fight Night: Silva vs. Irvin
|
|align=center|3
|align=center|5:00
|Las Vegas, Nevada, United States
|
|-
|Win
|align=center|7–1
|Krzysztof Soszynski
| Decision (split)
|IFL: Everett
|
|align=center|3
|align=center|4:00
|Everett, Washington, United States
|Heavyweight bout.
|-
|Win
|align=center|6–1
|Adam Maciejewski
|Submission (rear-naked choke)
|IFL: Moline
|
|align=center|2
|align=center|3:11
|Moline, Illinois, United States
|Heavyweight bout.
|-
|Win
|align=center|5–1
|Justin Levens
|Decision (unanimous)
|IFL: Oakland
|
|align=center|3
|align=center|4:00
|Oakland, California, United States
|
|-
|Win
|align=center|4–1
|Jamal Patterson
|TKO (punches)
|IFL: Championship Final
|
|align=center|2
|align=center|3:24
|Uncasville, Connecticut, United States
|
|-
|Loss
|align=center|3–1
|Aaron Stark
|TKO (punches)
|IFL: Portland
|
|align=center|3
|align=center|2:00
|Portland, Oregon, United States
|
|-
|Win
|align=center|3–0
|Mike Ciesnolevicz
|Decision (split)
|IFL: Championship 2006
|
|align=center|3
|align=center|4:00
|Atlantic City, New Jersey, United States
|Return to Light Heavyweight.
|-
|Win
|align=center|2–0
|Trevor Garrett
|Submission (rear-naked choke)
|Superbrawl: Icon 
|
|align=center|1
|align=center|4:15
|Honolulu, Hawaii, United States
|Middleweight debut.
|-
|Win
|align=center|1–0
|Kala Hose
|Decision (unanimous)
|Superbrawl 39
|
|align=center|3
|align=center|5:00
|Honolulu, Hawaii, United States
|
|-

References

External links
 
 

 Reese Andy on Facebook

1973 births
Living people
American male mixed martial artists
Mixed martial artists from North Dakota
Light heavyweight mixed martial artists
Mixed martial artists utilizing collegiate wrestling
Sportspeople from Renton, Washington
Wyoming Cowboys wrestlers
Ultimate Fighting Championship male fighters